The Raphael Semmes House, also known as the Horta–Semmes House, is a historic residence in Mobile, Alabama.  It is best known for having been the home of Admiral Raphael Semmes, captain of the Confederate sloop-of-war CSS Alabama.  The house was added to the National Register of Historic Places on February 26, 1970.

History
The Raphael Semmes House was built by its first owner, Peter Horta, in 1858.  The structure was purchased in 1871 by the citizens of Mobile and presented to Raphael Semmes.  Semmes lived here until his death in 1877. In the mid-twentieth century Mr. and Mrs. Joseph Linyer Bedsole purchased and restored the house, donating it on April 22, 1946, to the First Baptist Church of Mobile situated next door.  It was given in memory of their son, Lt. Joseph Linyer Bedsole, Jr., who was killed in action over Germany during World War II.

Architecture
The overall exterior design of the two-story brick townhouse is in a simple Federal style, with a Greek Revival entrance doorway and surround. The front (south) facade is adorned with a full-width cast iron porch across the ground floor, added in the 1870s. The ironwork features a floral design motif. Due to the narrow city lot upon which it was built, the house is much longer than it is wide. The ell served as the  service wing and was fronted on the courtyard side by wooden galleries on both floors that adjoined the matching rear galleries of the main house.

The interior layout features a stair hall on the west side of the house, on both floors.  The stairway is mahogany with turned spindles.  The stair hall opens onto a parlor and dining room on the first floor and three bedrooms on the second floor.  The parlor and dining room both retain their original black marble mantles.  The service ell contains a kitchen and storage room on the first floor and two servant rooms on the second.

References

National Register of Historic Places in Mobile, Alabama
Houses on the National Register of Historic Places in Alabama
Houses in Mobile, Alabama
Federal architecture in Alabama
Greek Revival houses in Alabama
Houses completed in 1858